Nyanya or niania is an ancient Russian dish. It consists of a sheep's abomasum stuffed with mutton brains, head meat, legs, onion and buckwheat porridge. After that, the dish can be fried in lard  or baked in the oven in a clay pot.

History
The dish is known from the 9th century.

Nyanya was forbidden by the Russian Orthodox Church because pagan Slavs used the dish in their rituals.

In literature
The nyanya is mentioned in "Dead Souls" by Nikolai Gogol: "My dear," said Sobakevitch, "the cabbage soup is excellent." With that he finished his portion, and helped himself to a generous measure of niania, the dish which follows shtchi and consists of a sheep's stomach stuffed with black porridge, brains, and other things. "What niania this is!" he added to Chichikov. "Never would you get such stuff in a town, where one is given the devil knows what."

The dish is also mentioned in the Saltykov-Shchedrin's novel "Old Years in Poshekhonye".

See also
 Haggis
 List of Russian dishes

References

Russian cuisine
National dishes